The London and North Eastern Railway (LNER) Class K4 is a class of 2-6-0 steam locomotives designed by Nigel Gresley for the steep grades of the West Highland Line.

West Highland Line challenge 
The North British Railway (NBR) West Highland line to Mallaig via Fort William, presented a combined triple operating challenge of: steep gradients; severe curves; and restrictive axle loading limits. Having used D34 'Glen' 4-4-0s, increased loads led to regular double-heading. Locomotive engineers proposed use of LNER Class K3, but they would not have been permitted to operate between Fort William and Mallaig.

Having proposed a new design based on a K3 boiler, in October 1924 a loan was made of a single LNER Class K2, which provided the required increase in power and adhesion. As K3s replaced K2 on the network, more K2s were loaned to the line, with the loan becoming permanent from October 1925.

With further increases in load and needs for additional traffic speed, in September 1934 Gresley instructed Doncaster Works to investigate the possibility of increasing the tractive effort of the K2s.

The eventual May 1936 design was based on the 1924 proposal for a 2-6-0 with  diameter coupled wheels, but with K3 cylinders, a K2 boiler, and a B17 firebox.

Prototype 
The prototype K4 No.3441 left Darlington for Eastfield depot, Glasgow on 28 January 1937. After five weeks of crew training and being confined to goods work it made its début on a passenger train on 4 March. It soon became apparent that the  boiler pressure brought little improvement in average speeds over the existing K2, and that No.3441 responded sluggishly when up against the gradients of the West Highland line. An advantage of the newcomer was that it used only marginally more coal in working 300 ton trains than the K2s did with considerably lighter loads.

The successful trials with No. 3441 led to five more being built. Apart from the prototype Loch Long all were named after Highland chieftains and grandees.

Operations 
 
The K4s quickly endeared themselves to the Scottish crews and, apart from some heavily loaded summer trains, eliminated uneconomic double-heading over the West Highland. However, as with all Gresley 2-6-0s it could be a rough ride at speed, and a locomotive designed to climb was not suited to the flat straight stretches of the line into Glasgow Queen Street railway station, or the 8.5 miles stretch alongside Loch Eil. Ride induced vibration was a problem on these stretches, and the middle big-end bearing would require regular nut tightening, with the middle connecting rod dropping off on one occasion: this resulted in increased maintenance inspections.

Crews began to prefer the LNER Class V4, but their lower power restricted their use and the K4s retained their pre-eminence on the West Highland line until the 1947 arrival of the first B1 4-6-0s, which replaced the K4s from Glasgow to Fort William. These were followed after nationalisation by an influx of Stanier 5MT 4-6-0s and the new K1s, that left the K4s increasingly confined to goods workings. 

During the 1950s, the K4s' sphere of operation enlarged and they began to appear at locations such as Edinburgh, Perth, Forfar, Ayr and Tweedmouth. In 1959 all were concentrated at Thornton in Junction depot in Fife and all were withdrawn in October 1961.

Numbering 

In 1945 Edward Thompson rebuilt 3445 MacCailin Mor into the first LNER Thompson Class K1. LNER 1946 numbers 1993–6/8 and BR numbers 61993–6/8.

Preservation 

One of the six strong class has survived into preservation, following the efforts of the late Viscount Garnock, who purchased No. 61994 The Great Marquess from British Rail (BR) and had the engine overhauled to working order. Based at Leeds No. 3442 undertook railtour work until forced into retirement by the ban imposed on steam working by BR in 1968. From 1972 No. 3442 was stored on the Severn Valley Railway (SVR) until 1980 when it was overhauled. In the mid 2000s, No. 3442 was bought by John Cameron and the locomotive left the SVR for overhaul at Crewe. 

Following the completion of its overhaul at Crewe it was returned to service on the mainline, alongside visiting heritage railways around the UK. During its mainline career, it has visited many places that none of the K4's visited during their working careers for the LNER and BR. Places it has visited in recent years include: Carlisle, Barrow Hill, Redmire, York, Manchester, Whitby & Blaenau Ffestiniog. It even proved popular working railtours up the "Conwy Valley line" from Llandudno Junction to Blaenau Ffestiniog, the routes gradient being 1 in 47 heading towards Blaenau.

61994 is now retired and on public display in the Museum of Scottish Railways, Bo'ness, where it is receiving cosmetic restoration by a small team of dedicated SRPS volunteers. The eventual plan will be for the owner, The Cameron Railway Trust, to house the locomotive in a museum to be built on John's Balbuthie farm, along with 60009 "Union of South Africa". However, planning permission for the construction of Johns museum has yet to be granted by Fife Council.

Sources

External links 

 The Gresley K4 2-6-0 Moguls LNER encyclopedia
 Class K4 Details at RailUK

K4
2-6-0 locomotives
Railway locomotives introduced in 1937
Standard gauge steam locomotives of Great Britain
1′C h3 locomotives